Konstantin Konstantinovich Rokossovsky (Russian: Константин Константинович Рокоссовский; ; 21 December 1896 – 3 August 1968) was a Soviet and Polish officer who became a Marshal of the Soviet Union, a Marshal of Poland, and served as Poland's Defence Minister from 1949 until his removal in 1956 during the Polish October. He became one of the most prominent Red Army commanders of World War II.

Born in Warsaw (in present-day Poland; then part of the Russian Empire), Rokossovsky served in the Imperial Russian Army during World War I. In 1917 he joined the Red Guards and in 1918 the newly-formed Red Army; he fought with great distinction during the Russian Civil War of 1917–1922. Rokossovsky held senior commands until 1937 when he fell victim to Joseph Stalin's Great Purge, during which he was branded a traitor, imprisoned and probably tortured.

After Soviet failures in the Winter War of 1939–1940, Rokossovsky was reinstated due to an urgent need for experienced officers. Following Germany's invasion of the Soviet Union in June 1941, Rokossovsky played key roles in the defense of Moscow (1941–1942) and the counter-offensives at Stalingrad (1942–1943) and Kursk (1943). He was instrumental in planning and executing part of Operation Bagration (1944)—one of the most decisive Red Army successes of the war—for which he was made a Marshal of the Soviet Union.

After the war, Rokossovsky became Defence Minister and deputy chairman of the Council of Ministers in the newly-established Polish People's Republic. Forced out of office in Poland in 1956 after Władysław Gomułka became the leader of Poland, Rokossovsky then returned to the Soviet Union, where he lived out the rest of his life until his death in 1968.

Biography

Konstanty Ksaveryevich Rokosovsky was born in Warsaw, then part of Congress Poland under Russian rule. His family had moved to Warsaw following the appointment of his father as the inspector of the Warsaw Railways. The Rokossovsky family were members of the Polish nobility (of the Oksza coat of arms), and over generations had produced many cavalry officers. However, Konstantin's father, Ksawery Wojciech Rokossowski, was a railway official in the Russian Empire and his Russian mother Antonina Ovsyannikova was a teacher. Orphaned at 14, Rokossovsky earned a living by working in a stocking factory.

In 1911, he became an apprentice stonemason. Much later in his life, the government of People's Republic of Poland used this fact for propaganda, claiming that Rokossovsky had helped to build Warsaw's Poniatowski Bridge. Rokossovsky's patronymic Ksaveryevich was Russified on his enlistment into the Russian Army at the start of the First World War to  Konstantinovich, which would be easier to pronounce in the 5th Kargopol Dragoon Regiment where he volunteered to serve.

Early military career

On joining the Kargopolsky 5th Dragoon Regiment, Rokossovsky soon showed himself a talented soldier and leader; he ended the war with the rank of a junior non-commissioned officer, serving in the cavalry throughout the war. He was wounded twice during the war and awarded the Cross of St George. In 1917, he joined the Bolshevik Party and soon thereafter, entered the ranks of the Red Army.

During the Russian Civil War he commanded a cavalry squadron of the Kargopolsky Red Guards Cavalry Detachment in the campaigns against the White Guard armies of Aleksandr Kolchak in the Urals where, in November 1919, he was wounded in the shoulder by an opposing officer whom he later killed when his cavalry overran an enemy headquarters. Rokossovsky received Soviet Russia's highest military decoration at the time, the Order of the Red Banner.

In 1921, he commanded the 35th Independent Cavalry Regiment stationed in Irkutsk and played an important role in bringing Damdin Sükhbaatar, the founder of the Mongolian People's Republic, to power. Famed "White Russian" general, adventurer and mystic Roman von Ungern-Sternberg, who allegedly believed he was the reincarnation of Genghis Khan, had driven the Chinese occupying forces out of Mongolia in 1920 and set himself up as dictator in Outer Mongolia. The next summer, when Ungern-Sternberg moved to capture the border town of Troitskosavsk, threatening to move north and cut off the Soviet far east from the rest of the Soviet Union, Rokossovsky quickly moved south from Irkutsk and met with the Sükhbaatar Mongol forces, defeating Urgern-Sternberg's army, which retreated in disarray after a two-day engagement. Rokossovsky was again wounded, this time in the leg. The combined Mongol and Soviet forces soon thereafter captured Ulaanbaatar.

It was in Mongolia that he met his wife Julia Barminan, a high school teacher who was fluent in four languages and who had studied Greek mythology, whom he married in 1923. Their daughter Ariadna was born in 1925. In 1924 and 1925 he attended the Leningrad Higher Cavalry School, where he first met Georgy Zhukov. He returned to Mongolia, where he was a trainer for the Mongolian People's Army. Soon after, while serving in the Special Red Banner Far Eastern Army under Vasily Blyukher, he took part in the Russo-Chinese Eastern Railroad War of 1929–1930 when the Soviet Union intervened to return the Chinese Eastern Railway to joint Chinese and Soviet administration, after Chinese warlord Zhang Xueliang of the Republic of China attempted to seize complete control of the railway.

It was in the early 1930s that Rokossovsky's military career first became closely intertwined with Semyon Timoshenko and Georgy Zhukov, when Rokossovsky was the commander of the 7th Samara Cavalry Division, Zhukov as a brigade commander under him and Timoshenko his superior Corps commander. Both became principal actors in his life during World War II, where he served directly under both at different times. A sense of the nature of the beginning of Rokossovsky's famous World War II rivalry with Zhukov can be gathered from reading Rokossovsky's comments in an official report on Zhukov's character:

Has a strong will. Decisive and firm. Often demonstrates initiative and skillfully applies it. Disciplined. Demanding and persistent in his demands. A somewhat ungracious and not sufficiently sympathetic person. Rather stubborn. Painfully proud. In professional terms well trained. Broadly experienced as a military leader... Absolutely cannot be used in staff or teaching jobs because constitutionally he hates them.

Rokossovsky was among the first to realize the potential of armoured assault. He was an early supporter of the creation of a strong armoured corps for the Red Army, as championed by Marshal Mikhail Tukhachevsky in his theory of "deep operations".

Purge and rehabilitation

Rokossovsky held senior commands until August 1937 when he became caught up in Joseph Stalin's Great Purge and was accused of being a spy. His association with the cutting edge methods of Marshal Tukhachevsky may have been the cause of his conflict with more traditional officers such as Semyon Budenny, who still favoured cavalry tactics over Tukhachevsky's mass armour theories, but few historians believe that the purge of the Red Army was solely a dispute over policy, and most attribute the purges to political and military rivalries as well.

Some officers were merely swept up on suspicion due to past associations; in Rokossovky's case his association with the Special Red Banner Far Eastern Army and the intrigues surrounding Marshal Vasily Blyukher, who was arrested shortly after Rokossovsky and who died in prison without confessing, may have been enough to trigger his arrest. Rokossovsky, however, survived.

He was variously accused of having links to Polish and Japanese intelligence and acts of sabotage under Article 58, section 14; "conscious non-execution or deliberately careless execution of defined duties", a section added to the penal code in June 1937.

The charges against Rokossovsky stemmed from the case of the "Anti-Soviet Trotskyist Military Organization of the 11th Mechanized Corps" where Rokossovsky was implicated after the arrest of Corps Commander Kasyan Chaykovsky who, like Rokossovsky, served in the far east in the early 1930s. The Intelligence Chief of the Transbaikal Military District accused Rokossovsky of meeting with Colonel Komatsubara, the head of the Japanese military mission in Harbin in 1932, when he was commander of the 15th Cavalry Division in Trans-Baikal; a fact that Rokossovsky did not dispute but justified as a meeting to resolve issues regarding Chinese prisoners. This accusation was supported with material charges, which included various acts of negligence of command that were interpreted as deliberate acts of sabotage (known as wrecking), such as allowing the quarters of his division to become slovenly, failing to conduct training, and leading his division out into bad weather causing losses of horses and encouraging sickness among his troops.

Upon his arrest by the NKVD, his wife and daughter were sent into internal exile, where his wife Julia was forced to support their daughter by finding odd jobs, which she would lose when it was discovered that her husband had been arrested as a "traitor".

V. V. Rachesky, a cell mate of Rokossovsky, wrote in his memoirs that Rokossovsky blamed the persecution of innocent people on the NKVD and was "naive", refusing to acknowledge Stalin's role in creating the treacherous environment. He described Rokossovsky's refusal to sign a false confession:

Those who refused to sign a false statement were beaten up, as long as the false statement was not signed. There were steadfast people who stubbornly did not sign. But there were relatively few. K. K. Rokossovsky, as he sat with me in the same cell, did not sign a false statement. But he was a brave and strong man, tall and broad-shouldered. He too was beaten.

His grandson, Colonel Konstantin Rokossovsky Vilevich, says that his grandfather escaped the fate of so many other officers because he refused to sign a false statement and by proving to the court that the officer who his NKVD accusers claimed had denounced him had been killed in 1920 during the civil war:

The evidence was based on the testimony of Adolph Yushkevich, a colleague of my grandfather in the Civil War. But my grandfather knew very well that Yushkevich died in Perekop. He said that he would sign [a confession] if Adolph was brought for a confrontation. They looked for Yushkevich and found that he had died long before. 

Alexander Solzhenitsyn reports that Rokossovsky endured two mock shooting ceremonies where he was taken out at night by a firing squad, but then returned to prison. Living relatives say that Svetlana Pavlovna, wife of Marshal Kazakov, confirmed that he sustained injuries including broken and denailed fingers and cracked ribs on top of enduring mock shooting ceremonies. Rokossovsky never discussed his trial and imprisonment with his family, only telling his daughter Ariadne that he always kept a gun because he would not surrender alive if they came to arrest him again.

In his famous "secret speech" of 1956, Nikita Khrushchev, when speaking on the subject of the purges, was probably referring implicitly to Rokossovsky when he stated, "suffice to say that those of them who managed to survive, despite severe tortures to which they were subjected in the prisons, have from the first war days shown themselves real patriots and heroically fought for the glory of the Fatherland".

After his trial Rokossovsky was sent to the Kresty Prison in Leningrad, where he remained until he was released without explanation on 22 March 1940. His release coincided with a relaxation of the Great Purge ushered in by the execution of NKVD chief Nikolay Yezhov on 4 February 1940, who was replaced by Lavrentiy Beria.

Semyon Timoshenko, who had been named People's Commissar for Defence of the Soviet Union after the debacle of the Winter War and was in urgent need of experienced officers to fill command posts for the rapidly expanding Soviet army, returned Rokossovsky to the command of the 5th Cavalry Corps at the rank of colonel. Subsequently, the 5th Cavalry Corps participated in the occupation of Bessarabia and he was soon promoted to the rank of a major general and given the command of the 9th Mechanized Corps, as part of M.I. Potapov's 5th Army under Mikhail Kirponos, commander of the Kiev Military District, which would later be renamed the Southwestern Front at the outbreak of hostilities with Germany.

World War II

1941: Operation Barbarossa; Dubno, Smolensk and Moscow

Battle of Dubno

When Nazi Germany attacked the Soviet Union in June 1941 Rokossovsky was serving as the commander of the 9th Mechanized Corps with the 35th and 20th Tank Divisions, and the 131st Motorized Division under his command.

He was immediately engaged in the early tank battles that raged around the Lutsk–Dubno–Brody triangle, also known as the Battle of Brody — an early Soviet counter-attack that was the most significant Soviet tank operation of the early stages of Operation Barbarossa.

The battle involved a large scale attack involving five mechanized corps aimed at penetrating the German line in the direction of Lublin based on a plan developed before hostilities commenced. Orders for the attack from Zhukov were met with little enthusiasm from the Southwestern Front staff that wanted to maintain a defensive posture. Nonetheless, the attack proceeded. The operation met with numerous difficulties in mobilization, coordination, communication, transportation and execution but scored some initial successes, which were parried by the quick action of Von Rundstedt's Army Group South in the Ukraine and ended in the destruction of most of the participating Soviet forces.

Upon receiving his orders Rokossovsky, whose divisions were stationed far to the rear of the frontier, had to commandeer trucks from the local reserve to carry munitions, and mount some of his infantry on tanks while the rest were forced to walk, splitting his forces. As a consequence, his forces were behind schedule and only an advanced guard were able to meet the 26 June "jump off", and entered the fray piecemeal. His orders were to move forward and take up positions around Lutsk north of the town of Dubno in co-ordination with the 19th Mechanized Corps under N. V. Feklenko, and attack south-west, while the Mechanized Corps of the 6th Army attacked northward from Brody to meet them, with the intent of cutting off the advance of the 11th Panzer Division east.

On 25 June, Rokossosky's 131st Motorized were quickly driven out of their position at Lutsk by the 14th Panzer Division, but the 35th and 20th Tank divisions were able to cobble together advance forces to cut the Lutsk–Dubno road, even though their full force had not yet arrived on the battlefield. On the same day elements of the 19th Mechanized Corps, operating to his east out of Rovno, had succeeded in temporarily driving the rearguard of the 11th Panzer Division from Dubno, cutting off its advance units. In response the 13th Panzer Division attacked south from Lutsk the next day clearing Rokossovsky's forces from the road and allowing German infantry to recapture Dubno, while it drove off the 19th Mechanized and captured Rovno in Rokossovsky's rear.

As German resistance stiffened, Mikhail Kirponos, the commander of the Southwestern Front, issued instructions to cease offensive operations that were immediately countermanded by his superior, Chief of General Staff G.K. Zhukov, who was visiting the headquarters. Zhukov insisted that the counter-attack continue against any counterarguments. As a result, Rokossovsky's command was bombarded with conflicting orders. According to Lieutenant-General Dmitry Ryabyshev, Rokossovsky "expressed no ambivalence about the proposed counteroffensive" and refused a direct order, effectively ending the dispute between Zhukov and Kirponos:

Because of this, Ryabyshev's 8th Mechanized, which had also scored some early successes operating out of Brody, was in effect continuing to attack from the south with the expectation of support from Rokossovsky, who had stood down his forces, and did not arrive from the north. Neither were aware of this fact, because there was no available direct communication between the individual corps, an example of how the endemic communication problems helped foil the Soviet efforts.

Throughout the next days, Rokossovsky's forces put considerable pressure on the Germans at Lutsk and tried to recapture Rovno in their rear, while stopping the advance of the 14th Panzer by ambushing them with 85mm anti-tank guns at close range and with good effect. He observed in his memoirs that "the terrain off-road was wooded and swampy, keeping the German advance to the road. The artillery Regiment of the 20th Tank division deployed its newly issued 85mm guns to cover the road and with direct fire repulsed the advancing Panzers.

The battles around Lutsk, Dubno and Brody fought by the 8th, 9th and 19th Mechanized Corps were most notable among Soviet operations in the early days of Barbarossa because the Southwestern Front was able to organize active operations, unlike most sectors of the front where the German assault was met with operational paralysis, and bought time to reorganize defense along the line of the old Polish border.

Sporadic attempts were made to close the widening gap between the Soviet 5th and 6th Armies, as the Germans advanced on Kiev, but the Soviet tank forces were but a fraction of their former strength. By 7 July, Rokossovsky's 9th Mechanized Corps had been reduced to 64 tanks, out of its original complement of 316.

Battle of Smolensk
While Rokossovsky and his fellow Mechanized Corps commanders of the 5th and 6th Army had been interdicting Army Group South's advance in Ukraine, complete disorder and panic gripped the Soviet forces in Byelorussia, where the disabling impact of poor organization, logistics and communications were exponentially greater. The Red Army collapsed under the well coordinated attack of Field Marshal von Bock's Army Group Center. Within seventeen days, during the Battle of Białystok–Minsk three quarters of D.G. Pavlov's Western Front was put out of action; dispersed, captured or killed. Of its initial complement of 625,000 soldiers, 290,000 were taken prisoner and 1,500 guns and 2,500 tanks were captured or destroyed. By 30 June the Germans had reached the approaches of the Dnepr river bend where the river departs from its east–west flow, and heads south. The way was open to the strategically important city of Smolensk, where Marshal Simon Timoshenko was reassembling the shattered Western Front on a new defense line.

The Battle of Smolensk commenced on 10 July when Army Group Center began advancing on a broad front to the north and south banks of the Dnepr river, just beyond the bend where it begins its southward flow.

The 9th Army attacked north-east toward Veliki Luki. The 3rd Panzer Group under General Hermann Hoth struck east at Vitebsk and then attacked along the land bridge that separates the West Dvina and Dnepr rivers with the aim of enveloping Smolensk from the north. Heinz Guderian's 2nd Panzer Group pushed toward Smolensk directly through Orsha and bypassed Mogilev with the ultimate objective of making a deep penetration far to the rear of the Soviet front line beyond Yelnya and toward Moscow.

Despite his insubordination during the Battle of Dubno, Rokossovsky was ordered to Moscow on 13 July to take command of the remnants of the 4th Army where he was to serve under Marshal Timoshenko who had replaced the disgraced Pavlov as the Western Front commander on 2 July, shortly after he and the majority of his staff had been tried and shot in the wake of the disaster at the frontier.

On 15 July, the same day that Rokossovsky was restored to the rank of lieutenant general, the rank he had held previous to his arrest, Major General Funck's 7th Panzer Division from the 3rd Panzer Group arrived at Yartsevo behind Smolensk. The next day motorized infantry from the 2nd Panzer Group forced most of the Soviet defenders from Smolensk, reducing the gap between 2nd and 3rd Panzer Groups to less than 20 kilometers. The 16th, 19th and 20th Soviet armies were threatened with impending encirclement and now strung out along the north bank of the river contained in a triangle between Vitebsk to the north-west, Yartsevo to the north-east, and Smolensk to the South.

With his front rapidly deteriorating Timoshenko released Rokossovsky from 4th Army (a command he had assumed in name only) and gave him the task of assembling a stopgap formation to be called "Group Yartsevo" that would deal with the emergency presented by the sudden appearance of the 7th Panzer at Yartsevo. This ad hoc operational group was to defend the bridgeheads of the Vop river, a tributary of the Dnepr, and prevent the southern and northern wings of the Panzer envelopment from converging at the Dnepr.

Collapse seemed imminent. Stalin, unmoved, reiterated his demand to Timoshenko that Smolensk should not be surrendered and called the "evacuation attitude" of the front-line commanders of the besieged armies criminally "treasonous". Rather than retreat, Timoshenko's armies would stand their ground and attempt to recapture Smolensk.

"Group Yartsevo" was in theory a large army-sized formation, but when Rokossovsky arrived at Timoshenko's headquarters on the evening of the 17th, he was in fact in charge of his own small staff, two quad anti-aircraft machine guns mounted on trucks and a radio van. At first, Rokossovsky had to resort to pulling together a fighting group from reserve units and retreating stragglers, but over the coming days it became a more substantial force. Retreating regiments and divisions from the 44th Rifle Corps filtered out of the Smolensk pocket and were transferred to his command and fresh forces arrived from the reserve—the 107th Tank Division (formerly the 69th Motorized Division from the Trans-Baikal Military District) and the 101st Tank Division equipped with 220 outdated but functional tanks.

What commenced was a confusing seesaw battle for control of Smolensk that saw portions of the city change hands several times over the next week, while Rokossovsky's group held the back door open and harassed the advanced German panzer formations.

Day by day, Rokossovsky's forces became stronger. As the Smolensk pocket deflated under German pressure Rokossovsky was able to press into service retreating soldiers and formations that slipped out of the pocket and employed them reinforcing the perimeter of the Yartsevo corridor. Eventually, the 38th Rifle Division was handed over to Rokossovsky when Timoshenko rationalized the command of the shrinking formations in the Smolensk pocket by disbanding Ivan Konev's 19th Army.

The Germans were faced with the dilemma of both containing the encircled armies, and dealing with Rokossovsky's burgeoning forces to their east. The 7th Panzer was soon joined by the 12th Panzer at Yartsevo, while the 20th held down their northern flank. With so many Panzer divisions tied down in defensive position containing Soviet activity both inside and outside of the pocket, much of the offensive punch of the Panzer Groups was blunted.

Even though "Group Yartsevo" had managed to halt the advance of Hoth's 3rd Panzer Group at Yartsevo, Guderian's 2nd Panzer Group continued to advance south of the Dnepr on Rokossovsky's left flank, becoming a more tangible threat with each passing day. On 18 July, Guderian's 10th Panzer Division entered the town of Yelnya 70 km south of Yartsevo and captured it on the 20th.

But on 19 July, German operational objectives for Smolensk changed when Hitler issued Führer Directive 33, ordering the Wehrmacht to temporarily cease its drive on Moscow, so that it could wheel south and finish off the Soviet defenders holding onto Kiev in Ukraine. As a result, Guderian's intended deep penetration was operationally obsolete, and Field Marshal von Bock became intent on mopping up the Soviet defenders at Smolensk so that the Panzer Groups could be released to Army Group South. Impatient with Guderian's slow going, Von Bock urged Guderian to drive north and close the Yartsevo corridor. In anticipation of this development, Rokossovsky had deployed the 107th Tank division to hold the area immediately south of Dnepr, and when the 10th Panzer undertook an unsupported attack northward toward Dorogobuzh from Yelnya, it was repulsed after three days of heavy fighting. The situation temporarily stabilized.

On 20 July, Zhukov ordered a general counterattack with the aim of relieving the encircled armies, and beginning on 21 July attacks began along the entire front, and continued for a number of days in an uncoordinated fashion. Meanwhile, the defenders in the pocket increased their efforts to recapture Smolensk. Attacks were made from the south against the flank of Guderian's advanced forces at Yelnya and Roslavl, and north of Yartsevo against Hoth's 2nd Panzer Group. Deep cavalry penetrations were made behind the German front behind Mogilev, disrupting logistics. Uncoordinated as the attacks were they had the effect of distracting the German advance for several days as intense battles took place increasing casualties on both sides. On the 24th Rokossovky's temporarily drove Funk's 7th Panzer from Yartsevo.

Unsupported by infantry the Wehrmacht advanced Panzer formations were taking inordinate casualties. To make further headway, both Hoth and Guderian needed to bring infantry forward to disentangle their mobile forces from their containment operations, and free them for attack, slowing the pace of advance.

By 25 July, Guderian had been able to free his considerable tank forces from defensive duties, and mobilized the 17th Panzer Division for a concerted effort to advance north and clear Rokossovsky from his tenuous position, but the 17th Panzer was still unable to reach the Dnepr and finally close the pocket. Nonetheless, under attack from north and south Rokossovsky was unable to prevent Hoth's 20th Motorized Infantry from capturing bridgeheads over the Dnepr on the 27th, sealing the pocket. The encircled armies fought intense breakout battles, and on the 28th Timoshenko ordered Rokossovsky to reopen the corridor by recapturing the bridgeheads. While he was unable to regain control of the river crossings, the 101st Tank Division recaptured Yartsevo on the 29th and held it for a few critical days.

Despite strenuous efforts over the next week, Rokossovsky was not able to secure a link to the armies in the pocket, but the intense Soviet activity kept the Germans from consolidating their front, allowing elements of the encircled 16th army to effect a breakout. By 4 August the front had stabilized and the defending armies within the pocket ceased resistance or had ceased to exist.

Rokossovsky is credited with slowing the German attack, and holding the Yartsevo corridor open for long enough to prevent the capture and destruction of a considerable numbers of Soviet troops. The broader consequences of Soviet resistance at Smolensk are evident in the Führer Directive No. 34, issued on 30 July 1941:

Battle of Moscow

In September 1941 Stalin personally appointed Rokossovsky to the command of 16th Army. He was ordered to defend the approaches to Moscow, and was now under the direct command of General Georgy Zhukov, his former subordinate. The 16th Army (later renamed the 11th Guards Army) played a key role in the Battle of Moscow when it was deployed along the main axis of the German advance along the Volokolamsk Highway that was a central junction of the bitter fighting during the German winter offensive of 1941 (Operation Typhoon), as well as the subsequent Soviet counter-attack of 1941–42.

On 18 November, during the last-ditch efforts of the Wehrmacht to encircle Moscow in 1941, General Rokossovsky, his soldiers under heavy pressure from Hoepner's 4th Panzer Group, asked his immediate superior, Zhukov, if he could withdraw the 16th Army to more advantageous positions. Zhukov categorically refused. Rokossovsky went over Zhukov's head, and spoke directly to Marshal Boris Shaposhnikov, now Chief of the General Staff in Zhukov's place; reviewing the situation Shaposhnikov immediately ordered a withdrawal. Zhukov reacted at once. He revoked the order of the superior officer, and ordered Rokossovsky to hold the position. In the immediate aftermath, Rokossovsky's army was pushed aside and the 3rd and 4th Panzer Groups were able to gain strategically important positions north of Moscow, but this marked the high point of the German advance upon Moscow. Throughout Operation Typhoon, Rokossovsky's 16th army had taken the brunt of the German effort to capture Moscow.

1942: Operation Fall Blau

In March 1942 Rokossovsky was badly injured by a piece of shrapnel. It was widely rumored that Valentina Serova was a mistress of Rokossovsky during this time. While it is true that Serova, working as a hospital volunteer, met Rokossovsky several times while he was recovering from his wound, it is not acknowledged they were lovers. Evidence for their close relationship was found in the accounts of frontline soldiers. 

Rokossovsky also had another mistress at this time, Dr. Lt. Galina Talanova, with whom he had a daughter in 1945. After two months in a Moscow hospital Rokossovsky was reunited briefly with the 16th Army.

Retreat to the Don

During 1942 the Wehrmacht commenced "Operation Fall Blau" and switched the axis of their offensive from Moscow and attacked southward into the eastern Ukraine towards the Don–Volga river line, Rostov, Voronezh, Stalingrad and the Caucasus beyond. There the Germans hoped to secure fresh supplies of oil to fuel their armies. Unlike the early days of 1941 the stiffening Soviet army maintained relatively good order in retreat, backing up along a defensive line along the Don river.

On 13 July 1942 Rokossovsky was given his first operational level command, a sign of his growing stature. The battles of Smolensk and Moscow had by no measure resulted in Red Army victory, but the front-line formations under his command were central to frustrating the Wehrmacht efforts to achieve the same and this was most likely reflected in Stalin's decision to make him commander of the Bryansk Front, where Stavka expected the main line of German attack to be renewed against Moscow in 1942—Rokossovsky was a trusted officer who could be counted on in a tight squeeze.

As the German offensive turned south, and toward Voronezh, the Bryansk sector turned out to be so quiet that Stavka shuffled the 38th Army to General Vatutin's Voronezh Front, during the heated Battle of Voronezh, where the Germans attempted to ford the Don River, and compromise the entire Soviet Don River defense. Rokossovsky recounts in his memoirs that during that summer Stalin phoned him personally to ask "whether I did not find the situation too dull for my liking" and was then recalled to Moscow to undertake command of a new operation:

The plan was to concentrate a strong force (no less than three combined armies and several armoured corps) on the flank of the enemy occupying the country between the Don and the Volga with the purpose of counter-attacking south and south-east from the vicinity of Serafimovich.

Subsequent events delayed the attack and it was shelved, only later to be resurrected as "Operation Uranus" with Vatutin playing the lead role, however Walsh asserts that Rokossovsky being originally selected to lead the attack "was symptomatic of his standing and the importance of his location as an indicator of significant, impending Soviet operations."

Operation Uranus

By the fall of 1942 the German army had pulled up along the new Soviet defense at the Don and Volga rivers, centered at Stalingrad, and had broken through south of Rostov toward the strategic oil centers of Tbilisi and Baku. Stalin was determined that Stalingrad should not fall, and the Red Army was given strict orders to hold the city at any cost. The Battle of Stalingrad became a struggle for control of the city that drew in combatants from both sides in brutal house-to-house fighting. 

On 28 September 1942, at Zhukov's urging, Rokossovsky was given overall command of the 65th Army (4th Tank Army), 24th Army and 66th Army, that were brought together as the Don Front as part of Stalin's much criticized reorganization of the Southern Front in preparation for the planned Soviet counterattack at Stalingrad: "Operation Uranus". This put Rokossovky's armies directly opposite the XI, VIII and XIV Corps of the 6th Army, including the 16th Panzer and 14th Panzer divisions, all of which were destroyed in the ensuing battle.

With German forces heavily engaged at Stalingrad and spread thinly due to their deep penetrations into the Caucasus, the Wehrmacht was increasingly reliant on their Romanian and Italian allies to cover the flanks of their extended line, on the north along the Don, and to the south along the Volga. "Operation Uranus" kicked off on 17 November with the intention of making a double envelopment of Paulus's men at Stalingrad by breaking through the flanks. The Southwestern Front commanded by General Vatutin quickly overwhelmed the 3rd Romanian Army just to the north of Rokossovsky's Don Front, while Yeryomenko's Stalingrad Front began their own attack just south of Stalingrad. Rokossovsky's Don Front played a largely subordinate role in the main attack, but the 65th Army supported Vatutin's attack from the north by outflanking the left extreme of the German line where it met the Romanian 3rd Army, while the 24th and 66th squeezed the German defenders—pinning them in place as the pincers of the main attacks rapidly enveloped them.

In less than a week, in the face of deteriorating weather and blizzard conditions, the Soviet forces had sealed the gap behind Stalingrad, and had begun to reinforce their investment around the city in order to prevent an attempted escape. No organized effort was made by the 6th Army to break out, and "Operation Winter Storm", a mid December German effort to relieve the encircled army, failed to break the Soviet defenses. Soon after, the Soviets launched "Operation Little Saturn" and completely consolidated their position.

Stalingrad

On 28 December Stalin gave Rokossovsky the task of mopping up the Stalingrad pocket. He had at his disposal roughly 212,000 men, 6,500 guns, 2,500 tanks, and 300 aircraft, to be used against an assortment of 200,000 defenders short on food, fuel, and ammunition, including Soviet "Hiwis", Romanians and Germans; in one example, nearly half the 6th Army's 297th Infantry Division fighting force were Soviets, however its artillery detachment was rationed to one and a half shells a day. On 8 January 1943, Rokossovsky ordered a cease-fire and sent a delegation to offer terms of surrender but Paulus did not respond, and resistance continued for the better part of the month.

On 10 January, the Don Front launched "Operation Ring" to reduce the Stalingrad pocket beginning with a 55-minute barrage from 7000 rocket launchers, artillery and mortars. The defenders fought tenaciously, even as their lines slowly collapsed, causing the Don Front 26,000 casualties, and destroying half its tanks in the first three days of the operation.

On 15 January Rokossovsky was promoted to the rank of colonel general.

On 16 January the main airfield used to supply the beleaguered 6th Army fell, and then after a pause of a few days, the offensive was renewed capturing the last operational airfield and finally driving the German back into the city proper on 22 January.

On that same day General Paulus asked Hitler for permission to surrender but was refused. On 26 January the Soviets had broken the surrounded Germans into two pockets, and on 31 January, the southern pocket collapsed and Paulus surrendered. Within four days the last significant group of defenders surrendered to Rokossovky's command, finally ending the battle that marked the high-water mark of the German advance during the Soviet–German war.

1943: Kursk

After the victory at Stalingrad the Russian forces advanced to a position that created a bulge 150 km deep and 250 km wide into the German line, around the city of Kursk. This subsequently became known as the Kursk Salient. Rokossovsky's command was moved to the north of the salient and was re-designated as a new front, which was twinned with the Voronezh Front, holding the south approaches.

In February 1943 Rokossovsky wrote in his diary: "I'm appointed commander of the Central Front. It means that Stalin has entrusted me to play the key part in the summer Kursk campaign."

Both the Red Army and the Wehrmacht prepared to make a decisive offensive in the summer of 1943 at Kursk. The Germans planned to drive two thrusts, one through each flank of the salient, and unite them at Kursk in order to cut off substantial Soviet forces, recover from the strategic loss at Stalingrad, and curtail further Russian advance. The Russians, alert to the coming attack, put their offensive plans aside and prepared for defense in depth with mass antitank units in prepared positions.

In late June one German bomb load in a night raid hit Rokossovsky's HQ, and he escaped only because on a whim he had decided to set up his signals group in the officers' mess. After that, Central Front HQ went underground in a bunker in the garden of a former monastery.

The German offensive, code named "Operation Citadel", was originally scheduled to begin in May but the attack was delayed several times in order to bring up fresh Panzer formations equipped with Tiger I's and Panther tanks and their latest assault guns. These delays allowed for even greater Soviet preparation. It was not until early July that the Wehrmacht operations in the Kursk salient got underway.

The resulting battle was one of the largest tank battles in World War II, with massive losses of men and equipment on both sides. As the commander of the Central Front, Rokossovsky's force was faced with a determined attack by the Army Group Center's 9th Army under Walter Model, including several tank formations augmented with the newest Tiger I tanks in battalion strength. Rokossovsky for his part had organized his defenses into three defensive belts. After the initial German assault, Rokossovsky ordered counter-attacks but the Soviet armor suffered badly in the face of the new German heavy Tiger tanks, and he went back on the defensive. Despite this, the Germans were soon bogged down in the heavily mined terrain and antitank defenses, and Rokossovsky was able to reinforce.

The Central Front was then renamed 1st Belorussian Front, which Rokossovsky commanded during the Soviet advance through Byelorussia (Belarus) and into Poland.

1944: Operation Bagration and the Warsaw Uprising

During the planning of the major Soviet offensive, Operation Bagration, in 1944, a famous incident occurred that various sources consistently report in slightly different versions. Rokossovsky disagreed with Stalin, who demanded in accordance with Soviet war practice a single break-through of the German frontline. Rokossovsky held firm in his argument for two points of break-through. Stalin ordered Rokossovsky to "go and think it over" three times, but every time he returned and gave the same answer "two break-throughs, comrade Stalin, two break-throughs". After the third time Stalin remained silent, but walked over to Rokossovsky and put a hand on his shoulder. A tense moment followed as the whole room waited for Stalin to rip the epaulette from Rokossovsky's shoulder; instead, Stalin said "Your confidence speaks for your sound judgement", and ordered the attack to go forward according to Rokossovsky's plan.

The battle was successful and Rokossovsky's reputation was assured. After crushing German Army Group Centre in Belarus, Rokossovsky's armies reached the east bank of the Vistula opposite Warsaw by mid-1944. For these victories he was advanced to the rank of Marshal of the Soviet Union. Stalin once said: "I have no Suvorov, but Rokossovsky is my Bagration".

As Rokossovsky's approached the Vistula, the Warsaw Uprising (August–October 1944) broke out in the city, led by the Polish Home Army (AK) on the orders of the Polish government in exile in London. Rokossovsky did not order reinforcement to the insurgents. There has been much speculation about Rokossovsky's personal views on this decision. He would always maintain that, with his communications badly stretched and enemy pressure against his northern flank mounting, committing forces to Warsaw would have been disastrous.

In November 1944, Rokossovsky was transferred to the 2nd Belorussian Front, which advanced into East Prussia and then across northern Poland to the mouth of the Oder at Stettin (now Szczecin). On 3 May 1945 he linked up with British Field Marshal Bernard Montgomery's 2nd Army in Wismar, Germany while the forces of Zhukov and Ivan Konev captured Berlin, ending the war.

In July 1945, he, Zhukov and several other Soviet officers were awarded the Order of the Bath in a ceremony at the Brandenburg Gate, in Berlin.

Post-war life

As one of the most prominent Soviet military commanders of the Second World War, Rokossovsky was present at the Victory Parade in Red Square in Moscow in 1945 as a Commanding Officer of the Parade, riding a seal brown stallion named Pole next to Marshal Georgy Zhukov, Inspector of the Parade, on his famous Idol.

After the end of the war Rokossovsky remained in command of Soviet forces in Poland (Northern Group of Forces). Fully four years later, in October 1949 with the establishment of the government under Bolesław Bierut in Poland, Rokossovsky, on Stalin's orders, became the Polish Minister of National Defense, with the additional title of Marshal of Poland. Rokossovsky is one of two foreign Marshals to receive the rank of Marshal of Poland, with other being Marshal of France Ferdinand Foch. Together with Rokossovsky, several thousand Soviet officers were placed in charge of almost all Polish military units, either as commanding officers or as advisors.

In 1952 he became deputy chairman of the Council of Ministers of the People's Republic of Poland. Although Rokossovsky was a Pole, he had not lived in Poland for 35 years and most Poles regarded him as a Russian and Soviet emissary in the country. As Rokossovsky himself bitterly put it: "In Russia, they say I'm a Pole, in Poland they call me Russian".

Rokossovsky played a key role in the regime's suppression of an independent Poland through Stalinization and Sovietization in general, and in the Polish Army in particular. As the de facto supreme commander of the Polish Army, he introduced various methods for the suppression of anti-Soviet activity, real or imagined. Among the most notorious were the labour battalions of the army, to which all able-bodied men found socially or politically insecure or guilty of having their families abroad were drafted. It is estimated that roughly 200,000 men were forced to work in these labour camps in hazardous conditions, often in quarries, coal mines, and uranium mines, and 1,000 died in their first days of "labour", while tens of thousands became crippled. Other groups targeted by these repressive measures were former soldiers of the pre-war Polish Army as well as the wartime underground Home Army.

In the June 1956 Poznań protests against local working conditions and living standards, as well as the Soviet influence over Poland, Rokossovsky approved an order to send in military units. As a result of this over 10,000 soldiers and 360 tanks crushed the protesters, and at least 74 civilians were killed.

In the wake of the Poznan riots and the "rehabilitation" of the formerly imprisoned communist reformer Władysław Gomułka in 1956, Rokossovsky went to Moscow in a failed attempt to persuade Nikita Khrushchev to use force against the Polish state. However, Gomułka managed to negotiate with the Soviets, and on the new Polish First Secretary's insistence Rokossovsky was forced to leave Poland. He returned to the Soviet Union, which restored his Soviet ranks and honours; and in July 1957, following the removal from office of Defence Minister Zhukov, Nikita Khrushchev appointed him Deputy Minister of Defence and commander of the Transcaucasian Military District. In 1958 he became chief inspector of the Ministry of Defence, a post he held until his retirement in April 1962.

Throughout his life, he was fond of hunting – he had a double-barreled IZh-49 12 gauge shotgun and a 20 gauge double-barreled TOZ shotgun made in 1905.

Rokossovsky died on 3 August 1968, of prostate cancer in Moscow, aged 71. His ashes were buried in the Kremlin Wall Necropolis on Red Square.

Dates of rank
 promoted major general, 4 June 1940
 promoted lieutenant general, 14 July 1941
 promoted colonel general, 15 January 1943
 promoted army general, 28 April 1943
 promoted Marshal of the Soviet Union, 29 June 1944
 declared Marshal of Poland 2 November 1949

Family
Rokossovsky and his wife Julia had a daughter named Ariadna (1925–1978). During World War II, he met military doctor Galina Talanova, with whom he had an illegitimate daughter named Nadezhda (born 1945).

Rokossovsky's great-granddaughter  (born 1980) works as a journalist for the Russian newspaper Rossiyskaya Gazeta.

Honours and awards
:
 Cross of St. George, 4th class
 Medal of St. George, 2nd, 3rd and 4th class

:
  "Gold Star" Hero of the Soviet Union, twice (29 July 1944, 1 June 1945)
 Order of Victory (No. 4 – 30 March 1945)
 Seven Orders of Lenin (16 August 1936, 2 January 1942, 29 July 1944, 21 February 1945, 26 December 1946, 20 December 1956, 20 December 1966)
 Order of the October Revolution (22 February 1968)
 Order of the Red Banner, six times (23 May 1920, 2 December 1921, 22 February 1930, 22 July 1941, 3 November 1944, 6 November 1947)
 Order of Suvorov, 1st class (28 January 1943)
 Order of Kutuzov, 1st class (27 August 1943)
 Medal "For the Defence of Stalingrad" (22 December 1942)
 Medal "For the Defence of Moscow" (1 May 1944)
 Medal "For the Defence of Kiev" (21 June 1961)
 Medal "For the Liberation of Warsaw" (9 June 1945)
 Medal "For the Capture of Königsberg" (9 June 1945)
 Medal "For the Capture of Berlin" (9 June 1945)
 Medal "For the Victory over Germany in the Great Patriotic War 1941–1945" (9 May 1945)
 Jubilee Medal "Twenty Years of Victory in the Great Patriotic War 1941-1945" (7 May 1965)
 Jubilee Medal "XX Years of the Workers' and Peasants' Red Army" (22 February 1938)
 Jubilee Medal "30 Years of the Soviet Army and Navy" (22 February 1948)
 Jubilee Medal "40 Years of the Armed Forces of the USSR" (18 December 1957)
 Jubilee Medal "50 Years of the Armed Forces of the USSR" (26 December 1967)
 Medal "In Commemoration of the 800th Anniversary of Moscow"
 Honorary weapon – sword inscribed with golden national emblem of the Soviet Union (1968)

:
 Order of the Builders of People's Poland (1951)
 Order of the Cross of Grunwald, 1st class (1945)
 Grand Cross of the Virtuti Militari (1945)
 Medal "For Warsaw 1939-1945" (1946)
 Medal "For Oder, Neisse and the Baltic" (1946)
 Medal of Victory and Freedom 1945 (1946)

:
 Medal of Sino-Soviet Friendship (1956)

:
 King Christian X's Liberty Medal (1947)

:
 Grand Officer of the Legion d'Honneur (9 June 1945)
 Croix de guerre (1945)

:
 Order of Sukhbaatar (18 March 1961)
 Order of the Red Banner (1943)
 Order of Friendship (1967)

:
 Honorary Knight-Commander of the Order of the Bath, (military division) (1945)

:
 Chief Commander of the Legion of Merit (1946)

Monuments and Memorial

References

Cited sources

External links

Soviet newsreels about Konstantin Rokossovsky // Net-Film Newsreels and Documentary Films Archive
Rokossowski speech on National Unity Congress in Poland (December 1949)
 Герой Сталинградской и Курской битв
 Комдив Рокоссовский
 Маршал Рокоссовский
 

1896 births
1968 deaths
Deaths from prostate cancer
Deaths from cancer in the Soviet Union
Military personnel from Warsaw
People from Warsaw Governorate
Members of the Politburo of the Polish United Workers' Party
Central Committee of the Communist Party of the Soviet Union candidate members
Ministers of National Defence of Poland
Second convocation members of the Soviet of the Union
Members of the Polish Sejm 1952–1956
Fifth convocation members of the Soviet of the Union
Sixth convocation members of the Soviet of the Union
Seventh convocation members of the Soviet of Nationalities
Marshals of the Soviet Union
Marshals of Poland
Russian military personnel of World War I
Soviet military personnel of World War II
Polish people of World War II
Soviet officers in Polish Army 1943-1968
Polish people detained by the NKVD
Recipients of the Cross of St. George
Recipients of the Order of Victory
Recipients of the Virtuti Militari (1943–1989)
Grand Crosses of the Virtuti Militari
Recipients of the Order of the Builders of People's Poland
Heroes of the Soviet Union
Recipients of the Order of Suvorov, 1st class
Recipients of the Order of Lenin
Recipients of the Order of the Red Banner
Recipients of the Order of Kutuzov, 1st class
Recipients of the Order of the Cross of Grunwald, 1st class
Honorary Knights Commander of the Order of the Bath
Chief Commanders of the Legion of Merit
Foreign recipients of the Legion of Merit
Grand Officiers of the Légion d'honneur
Recipients of the Croix de Guerre 1939–1945 (France)
Polish emigrants to the Soviet Union
Nobility from Warsaw
Russian people of Polish descent
Polish people of Russian descent
Polish people of Belarusian descent
Burials at the Kremlin Wall Necropolis
Bamlag detainees
Inmates of Kresty Prison
Frunze Military Academy alumni